Mirza Agha Muhammad Baqer was an aristocrat of the Mughal Empire and the Zamindar of Buzurg-Umedpur and Salimabad. In the Mughal period, these two parganas were spread over a large part of the greater Barisal region. Baker was the son-in-law of Murshid Quli Khan II (Lutfullah Tabrizi), the Naib Nazim of Orissa under Nawab Sarfaraz Khan. Baqer had an important role in the conflict between Tabrizi and Alivardi Khan regarding the inheritance of Orissa's Naib Nazimate. He also founded the port marketplace of Bakerganj, which later became the headquarters of the Backergunge District (now Barisal Division, Bangladesh). The legendary origin of the Bakarkhani bread is also attributed to him.

Career 
On 10 April 1740, the Battle of Giria near Murshidabad took place between Alivardi Khan and the Nawab of Bengal Sarfaraz Khan. After this war, Alivardi became the next Nawab of Bengal. Although the division of Orissa was included within the Principality of Bengal, Alivardi Khan was futile in taking control of that region. The Nizamate of Orissa was governed by Naib Nazim Murshid Quli Khan II who rejected Alivardi Khan's succession. In this situation, Mirza Agha Muhammad Baqer joined the cause of his father-in-law, the Naib Nazim of Orissa, to defeat Alivardi Khan. They proceeded from Cuttack in Orissa towards Balasore and towards December 1740, established a camp at Phulwari Sharif in Bihar. Murshid Quli Khan II was severely wounded in battle and was defeated on 3 March 1741, later fleeing to Machilipatnam in South India with Baqer. The Naib Nazim's friend Murad Khan, the Zamindar of Khordha, intervened and saved his family from the clutches of Alivardi's troops. Later, Shah Murad, the commander of Murshid Quli Khan II, took them to Baqer. In the Deccan, they have to live in extreme misery. After that, Alivardi appointed his nephew and son-in-law Syed Ahmad Khan as the Naib Nazim of Orissa, and returned to his capital at Murshidabad. After recovering, Baqer reached Cuttack in August 1741 with a contingent of Maratha infantry led by Mir Habib. They captured Syed Ahmed Khan and his family and kept them under strict guard. After that, they gained control of Midnapore and Hijli. After hearing of this news, Alivardi Khan decided to confront Baqer. On December 1741, Khan defeated Baqer in a war in the southern banks of the Mahanadi at Raipur. Thus, Baqer and his Maratha allies had no choice but to flee back to the Deccan.

Surrender and business 
Agha Baqer probably surrendered to Alivardi Khan in early 1742 as he was made the Jagirdar of the parganas of Buzurg Umedpur and Salimabad. He served in this position until his death in 1754. He established a large ganj (marketplace) in Buzurg Umedpur in 1741, and called it Bakerganj (market of Baqer). Bakerganj developed into an important port city at that time, inviting Persian and Armenian merchants and Kashmiri khwajas who travelled their for salt and skin business.

Personal life
Baqer married the sister of Mahdi and Sharfuddin Majumdar of Bakla.

Death 
Agha Baqer probably resided in Jahangir Nagar (Dhaka) and managed the zamindari through his representative. Agha Baqer and his son Agha Sadeq were involved in the Murshidabad palace conspiracy and they were clearly loyalists of the next Nawab Siraj ud-Daulah. The Naib Nazim of Jahangir Nagar Nawazish Muhammad Khan's two representatives were his nephews Husayn Quli Khan and Husayn ad-Din Khan, who were accused by the Nawab of conspiring against him. With the assistance of Agha Sadeq, he had Husayn ad-Din killed in 1754. In the same year, Mirza Ali Naqi, a relative of Husayn ad-Din and the Kotwal of Jahangir Nagar, attacked Agha Baqer's house to avenge the assassination. Agha Sadeq fled to Murshidabad through the back door, leaving his aged father Mirza Muhammad Agha Baqer in the wrath of the mob. In present times, the northern part of the Aga Sadek Park in Dhaka has a mazar (mausoleum) which contains the tomb of Mirza Agha Baqer.

See also 
 Bakarkhani
 Bakerganj Upazila

References 

Mughal Empire people
1754 deaths
18th-century Indian Muslims
Rulers of Barisal